Jacumba Airport  is a county-owned public-use airport located one nautical mile (1.85 km) east of the central business district of Jacumba, in San Diego County, California, United States.

Facilities and aircraft 
It has one runway designated 7/25 with a gravel surface measuring 2,508 by 100 feet (764 x 30 m).

For the 12-month period ending December 31, 2020, the airport had 734 general aviation aircraft operations, an average of 61 per month.

World War II
Jacumba Hot Springs Airport was used by the US Navy during World War II as an outlying field to support NAS San Diego.

References

External links 
 Jacumba Airport at County of San Diego website
 Aerial image as of 28 May 2002 from USGS The National Map

Airports in San Diego County, California
Mountain Empire (San Diego County)